The 1945 Segunda División Peruana, the second division of Peruvian football (soccer), was played by 6 teams. The tournament winner, Santiago Barranco was promoted to the Promotional Playoff. Association Chorrillos and Unión Callao was promoted to the 1946 Segunda División Peruana. The league table is incomplete.

Results

Standings

Promotion playoff

External links
 La Historia de la Segunda 1945

 

Peruvian Segunda División seasons
Peru2
2